Phyllonorycter olivaeformis is a moth of the family Gracillariidae. It is known from Maine, New York and Ohio in the United States.

The wingspan is about 6.5 mm.

The larvae feed on Carya illinoinensis. They mine the leaves of their host plant. The mine has the form of an underside tentiform mine. Pupation takes place inside a black, frass-covered ovate cocoon

References

External links
Bug Guide
mothphotographersgroup
Phyllonorycter at microleps.org

olivaeformis
Moths of North America
Moths described in 1908